Ashley Alan Cooper (11 July 1980 – 25 February 2008) was an Australian race car driver. Cooper died from severe head and internal injuries after a high-speed racing accident.

Career

Cooper began his racing career in 1998 driving Holden HQ sedans. Leading the 2005 Commodore Cup championship for most of the year, Cooper finished fourth at the final round at Eastern Creek Raceway. In 2006, Cooper was crowned V8 Utes Rookie of the Year. He competed in three rounds of the 2007 Fujitsu V8 Supercar Series, with a top 15 finish at Queensland Raceway.

Death

Cooper suffered severe head and internal injuries after crashing his Holden VZ Commodore into a concrete barrier at over  during the Fujitsu V8 Supercars Series race at the Clipsal 500 in Adelaide on 23 February 2008.

Cooper had been given emergency medical treatment trackside from medical teams, including Dr Bill Griggs, who performed a tracheotomy to assist with Cooper's breathing. Cooper was taken to the Royal Adelaide Hospital by ambulance and was put on life support. He died two days later, at the age of 27. A registered organ donor, Cooper's heart, lungs, kidneys, pancreas and liver have been donated to seven people, including a six-year-old child.

References

External links
 Ashley Cooper Motorsport website

1980 births
2008 deaths
Racing drivers from Sydney
Sportsmen from New South Wales
Supercars Championship drivers
Racing drivers who died while racing
Sport deaths in Australia
Accidental deaths in South Australia
Organ transplant donors
Filmed deaths in motorsport